= Geology of the Cocos (Keeling) Islands =

The Cocos (Keeling) Islands are located in the Indian Ocean at 15º06'00.02"S, 97º03'51.42"E.

Sediments on the island include sand and gravel from the Holocene and cemented conglomerates made of coral fragments.
